Alan McKenna may refer to:

 Alan McKenna (actor), British actor
 Alan McKenna (footballer) (born 1961), Scottish footballer
 Alan McKenna (Neighbours), fictional character on the Australian soap opera Neighbours